Culiseta incidens, the cool weather mosquito, is a species of mosquito in the family Culicidae.  Specimens have been collected in Southern California.

References

Culicinae
Articles created by Qbugbot
Insects described in 1869